Gedangan Station (GDG) is a class III railway station located in Gedangan, Gedangan, Sidoarjo Regency, included in Operation Area VIII Surabaya at an altitude of +4 meters.

Services 
The following is a list of train services at the Gedangan Station.

 Economy class
 Local economy:
 Commuter:

References

Sidoarjo Regency
Railway stations in East Java
Railway stations opened in 1878